Au rendez-vous de la mort joyeuse is a 1973 horror film directed by Juan Luis Buñuel (the son of Luis Buñuel). It is also known as At the Meeting with Joyous Death (International English title) and Expulsion of the Devil (USA) and Lune lune coquelune.

Plot
A married couple purchases an abandoned house in the countryside. Soon they witness strange apparitions and events. Their son and moreover their daughter are haunted by a poltergeist.

Cast
 Françoise Fabian : Françoise
 Jean-Marc Bory : Marc
 Jean-Pierre Darras : Peron
 Claude Dauphin : Father D'Aval
 Michel Creton : Leroy
 Gérard Depardieu : Beretti
 Renato Salvatori : Henri
 André Weber : Kleber
 Yasmine Dahm : Sophie

References

External links 
 
 
 TCM's Movie Morlocks on Au rendez-vous de la mort joyeuse

1973 horror films
1973 films
French supernatural horror films
1970s French-language films
Italian supernatural horror films
1970s French films
1970s Italian films